The Milroy State Bank Building is located in the small town of Milroy, Minnesota at the intersection of Superior Street and Euclid Avenue (Minnesota State Highway 68). The building was a former community bank built in 1902 by a group of businessmen from Springfield, Minnesota. It is nearly identical to the Clements State Bank Building in Clements, Minnesota representing the commercial investment of outsiders in a string of towns platted on a new railroad line, the Minnesota Western Branch of Chicago and North Western Railway.

The bank closed in 1930 and was used for several purposes including a doctors office, and a bank exchange. It was the post office of Milroy from 1951 until 1989 when a new post office was built. On August 11, 1980 the building was listed on the National Register of Historic Places along with several other buildings in Redwood County, Minnesota.

Throughout the years the building stood abandoned, sitting unheated and the roof had also collapsed. In 2009 a local, Sunny Ruthchild, purchased the building for around $1,000 and renovated it which included improvements to the roof, restoration of the floors, and the installation of high-efficiency windows and a geothermal heat pump. The upper part of the building is currently leased as an apartment and the lower part currently sits empty with plans to turn it into a small business such as a bakery or café.

See also
National Register of Historic Places listings in Redwood County, Minnesota

References

Bank buildings on the National Register of Historic Places in Minnesota
Buildings and structures in Redwood County, Minnesota
Commercial buildings completed in 1902
National Register of Historic Places in Redwood County, Minnesota